Mariano Ozores Puchol (born 5 October 1926) is a Spanish film director and screenwriter. He was a prolific specialist in the sex comedy and Francoist comedy.

He is the brother of Jose Luis Ozores (1923–1968) and Antonio Ozores (1928–2010), and the uncle of actresses Adriana Ozores and Emma Ozores. He is currently married and has one child.

He directed La que arman las mujeres (1969), Cuatro noches de boda (1969), Tío, ¿de verdad vienen de París? (1977), El liguero mágico (1980) and Agítese antes de usarla (1983).

Selected filmography
 The Dancer and the Worker (1936)
Desert Warrior (1957) 
 Night and Dawn (1958)
 The Daughters of Helena (1963)
Forty Degrees in the Shade (1967)
 Operation Mata Hari (1968)
 La descarriada (1973)

References

Bibliography

External links
 

1926 births
Living people
Film directors from Madrid
Spanish screenwriters
Spanish male writers
Male screenwriters
Writers from Madrid